Acanthopyge is an extinct genus of lichid trilobite that lived during the Devonian. Very few A. consanguinea from the Devonian of Oklahoma have been found, and only a handful of complete specimens from Morocco, and many so-called Acanthopyge-specimens from Morocco are fake.

References

Sources 
Photos of A. consanguinea
 Trilobite info (Sam Gon III)

External links
 Trilobite info (Sam Gon III)

Lichida
Silurian trilobites
Devonian trilobites of North America
Fossils of Morocco
Fossils of the United States
Silurian first appearances
Middle Devonian genus extinctions
Paleozoic life of Ontario
Paleozoic life of the Northwest Territories